is a Japanese voice actress and theatre actress. She is also a singer and a composer, and performed songs for the Wild Arms video game series. She is managed by Amuse, Inc. She voiced the title character Ririka Moriya/Nurse Angel in Nurse Angel Ririka SOS. and sang two of the ending themes.

Filmography

Anime

Overseas dubbing

Video games

References

External links
  
 Official website  (archive, up to 2009) 

1967 births
Living people
Japanese voice actresses
Voice actresses from Tokyo
Amuse Inc. talents